Rahat Fateh Ali Khan is a Pakistani Sufi singer and musician, primarily of Qawwali, devotional music of the Muslim Sufis. He has won awards including Lux Style Awards, UK Asian Music Awards, ARY Film Awards, and Hum Awards.

On June 26, 2019, Rahat was awarded an Honorary Doctorate of Music by the University of Oxford. He also won the Wembley Arena Award in 2019. Rahat has won four Lux Style Awards and four UK Asian Music Awards. He also has been nominated four times for Filmfare Awards, four times for IIFA Awards, and four times for Mirchi Music Awards. Rahat received a Lifetime Achievement Award from, and honorary membership in, the Arts Council of Pakistan in Karachi.

Lux Style Awards

ARY Film Awards

Hum Awards

Pakistan Media Awards 
The Pakistan Media Awards (commonly known as the PMA), are a set of awards given annually for radio, television, film, and theater achievements. The awards are given each year at a formal ceremony.

UK Asian Music Awards

Filmfare Awards 
The Filmfare Awards are a set of awards that honour artistic and technical excellence in the Hindi-language film industry of India. Rahat has been nominated five times and won one award.

IIFA Awards 
The International Indian Film Academy Awards (also known as the IIFA Awards) are a set of awards presented annually by the International Indian Film Academy to honor both artistic and technical excellence of professionals in Bollywood, the Hindi language film industry. Atif Aslam has won one award, with four additional nominations.

Star Screen Awards 
The Screen Awards is an annual awards ceremony held in India honoring professional excellence in Bollywood. Atif has won twice.

Producers Guild Film Awards

Mirchi Music Awards

Masala Lifestyle Popular Choice Awards

The Musik Awards

BIG Star Entertainment Awards 
Big Star Entertainment Awards were presented annually by Reliance Broadcast Network Limited in association with Star India to honor personalities from the field of entertainment across movies, music, television, sports, theater, and dance.

London Asian Film Festival

PTC Punjabi Film Awards

International Pakistan Prestige Awards

See also 
 List of awards and nominations received by Atif Aslam
 List of awards and nominations received by Ali Zafar
 Rahat Fateh Ali Khan discography

References 

Awards
Lists of awards received by Pakistani musician